Saulcy-sur-Meurthe (literally Saulcy on Meurthe) is a commune in the Vosges department in Grand Est in northeastern France. World War I top scoring flying ace René Fonck was born here in 1894.

See also
Communes of the Vosges department

References

External links

Official site

Communes of Vosges (department)